Fred Kohlmar (August 10, 1905 - October 13, 1969) was a New York City-born film producer.  The former agent worked as an executive assistant to Samuel Goldwyn before becoming a producer in the 1930s.  He worked for 20th Century Fox, Paramount Pictures, and Columbia Pictures. Lee Kohlmar was his father.

Selected filmography
 The Lone Wolf Strikes (1940)
The Lady Has Plans (1942)
Take a Letter, Darling (1942)
The Dark Corner (1946)
Kiss of Death (1947)
The Ghost and Mrs. Muir (1947)
My Sister Eileen (1955)
Picnic (1955)
The Wackiest Ship in the Army (1960)
Bye Bye Birdie (1963)
How to Steal a Million (1966)

References

1905 births
1969 deaths
American film producers
20th-century American businesspeople